4-hydroxybenzoate geranyltransferase (PGT1, PGT2, 4HB geranyltransferase, 4HB:geranyltransferase, p-hydroxybenzoate geranyltransferase, PHB geranyltransferase, geranyl diphosphate:4-hydroxybenzoate geranyltransferase) is an enzyme with systematic name geranyl-diphosphate:4-hydroxybenzoate 3-geranyltransferase. This enzyme catalyses the following chemical reaction

 geranyl diphosphate + 4-hydroxybenzoate   3-geranyl-4-hydroxybenzoate + diphosphate

The enzyme is involved in shikonin biosynthesis. It has a strict substrate specificity for geranyl diphosphate and an absolute requirement for Mg2+.

References

External links 
 

EC 2.5.1